The 2010 NACAC Cross Country Championships took place on March 6, 2010.  The races were held at the Mount Irvine Bay Golf Course in Mount Irvine, Tobago, Trinidad and Tobago.  The course was described to be generally flat with two inclines, one approximately 100m long, and the other 60m long.  A detailed report of the event was given for the IAAF.

Complete results were published.

Medallists

Medal table (unofficial)

Note: Totals include both individual and team medals, with medals in the team competition counting as one medal.

Participation
According to an unofficial count, 107 athletes from 11 countries participated.  The announced athletes from the  did not show.

 (4)
 (1)
 (7)
 (12)
 (7)
 (12)
 México (16)
 (12)
 (1)
 (15)
 (20)

See also
 2010 in athletics (track and field)

References

External links
 Official website

NACAC Cross Country Championships
NACAC Cross Country Championships
NACAC Cross Country Championships
NACAC Cross Country Championships
Cross country running in Trinidad and Tobago